Harikrishna Singh is an Indian politician from the Bharatiya Janata Party. He is the state legislative assembly member from Manika since 2009.

References

Bharatiya Janata Party politicians from Jharkhand
Living people
Year of birth missing (living people)